The Kraut line was a trio of Boston Bruins hockey players who played on the same NHL forward line: center Milt Schmidt, left wing Woody Dumart, and right winger Bobby Bauer.
The name was devised by Albert Leduc, a player for the Montreal Canadiens, while the trio were playing for a Boston farm club in 1936; initially, "The Sauerkraut Line", the nick name was shortened later to "The Kraut Line". This referenced the German descent of the three players, all of whom grew up in Kitchener, Ontario, where they played for the Kitchener Greenshirts. The trio played almost 1,900 NHL games with the Boston Bruins but put their careers on hold during WWII to serve in the Royal Canadian Air Force. They were one of the most dominant lines of any era, having finished first, second, and third in scoring during the 1939-1940 season, a feat repeated only twice, by the 1944–45 Punch line and the 1949–50 Production Line.

History
The three were famously attached and lived together in a single room in Brookline, Massachusetts.  This line was so accomplished that in the 1939–1940 season, the trio was 1–2–3 in NHL scoring.  Center Milt Schmidt led the league in scoring with 22 goals and 30 assists; left wing Woody Dumart was second in the league with 22 goals and 21 assists; and third in scoring was right wing Bobby Bauer with 17 goals and 26 assists.  While the line was intact, the Boston Bruins won the Stanley Cup championship in the 1938–1939 and 1940–1941 seasons.

In the midst of World War II, the line enlisted with the Royal Canadian Air Force as a trio from 1942 to 1946. On February 10, 1942, their last game before reporting for duty, the line accounted for half of the 22 points in goals and assists the Bruins accumulated on the way to an 8–1 victory over Montreal at Boston Garden. The Kraut line had produced three goals and eight assists. Not long after enlisting, the trio played for the Ottawa RCAF hockey team, helping to win the 1942 Allen Cup. During the war, contests were held to change towards a non-Germanic name for the line, with The Kitchener Kids one of the favorites, but at the war's end the name returned.

Bobby Bauer's retirement in 1947 ended the line.  On March 18, 1952, the line participated in a special reunion game in which Schmidt scored his 200th career goal and Bauer had a goal and an assist, despite having been retired the five previous years, in a 4-0 victory over the Chicago Black Hawks.

After their days as players, Schmidt eventually went on to coach the Bruins for 726 games. Bauer went back to the Kitchener area and coached several teams. Dumart retired in Boston, where he worked for some years as the official scorer at the Garden. All three were inducted into the Hockey Hall of Fame: Schmidt in 1961, Dumart in 1992, and Bauer in 1996.

The trio is deceased. Bauer died on September 16, 1964, at age 49.  Dumart died on October 19, 2001, at age 84. Schmidt died on January 4, 2017, at age 98.

Statistics

Note: These are statistics from the seven regular seasons in which the three players generally played on the same line. 
GP = Games played; G = Goals; A = Assists; Pts = Points; PIM = Penalty in Minutes

See also
Line (ice hockey)
List of ice hockey linemates

References

External links
Milt Schmidt
Bobby Bauer
Woody Dumart

History of the Boston Bruins
Nicknamed groups of ice hockey players